Giovanniccia Candiano, also called Giuliana, was Dogaressa of Venice by her marriage to the Doge Pietro IV Candiano (r. 959–976) and mother of future doge Vitale Candiano.

Giovanniccia was not a member of the aristocracy and was previously divorced when Pietro entered into a relationship with her, and when he made her dogaressa after his installation it caused a scandal and a social boycott which damaged the reputation of the doge. Eventually, Pietro was convinced to divorce her and imprison her as a nun in the convent of San Zaccaria. She has been the subject of legends and myths. She is a part of a famous deck of cards featuring the dogaressas of Venice, as the Four of Hearts.

Sources 
 Staley, Edgcumbe:  The dogaressas of Venice : The wives of the doges, London : T. W. Laurie, 1910
 Info

Dogaressas of Venice
10th-century Venetian people
10th-century Italian women
Giovanniccia